The Avoca Lake, formerly known as Avoca Lagoon and as Bulbararing Lagoon, is an intermittently closed intermediate saline coastal lagoon that is located on the Central Coast region of New South Wales, Australia.

Features and location
The Avoca Lake is fed by stormwater runoff into Salwater Creek that gathers on the slopes within Kincumber Mountain Reserve to the northwest above Pickets Valley. Its outflow is into Bulbararing Bay in the Tasman Sea of the South Pacific Ocean. The outflow is generally closed, and water levels inside the lake are not usually influenced by ocean tides.

Bareena Island lies entirely within Avoca Lake.

Terrigal Lagoon and Wamberal Lagoon are located to the north and are a short distance away.

See also

 List of lakes of Australia

References

External links
 
 
 
 

Lakes of New South Wales
Coastline of New South Wales
Central Coast (New South Wales)